Bernard Reginald Stanhope Harrison (28 September 1934 – 18 March 2006) was an English sportsman who played first-class cricket for Hampshire and professional football with Crystal Palace, Southampton and Exeter City. As a cricketer he was an opening batsman who played a part in Hampshire winning the County Championship in 1961, whilst in football he played at outside right.

Early life
Harrison was born at St. John's, Worcester, close to New Road, the home of Worcestershire County Cricket Club.

He was educated at Peter Symonds College in Winchester, Hampshire and was a keen all round sportsman who excelled from an early age in both cricket and football. During his period of National Service he represented the army in both sports.

Football career

Crystal Palace
Harrison was an England schoolboy international and in October 1952, he joined Portsmouth as a trainee, on amateur terms. Unable to break into the first team, he moved to Crystal Palace in October 1955.

At Crystal Palace he was given a professional contract and made his first team debut in March 1956, as Palace finished second from bottom in the Third Division South and were forced to seek re-election. In the 1956–57 season, Harrison became established in the side, normally at outside-right with Johnny Byrne on the left, providing scoring opportunities for the front men, including Mike Deakin at centre forward and Peter Berry and Barry Pierce as the inside-forwards. Harrison himself contributed four goals, as Palace finished 20th in the table. In 1957, Soccer Star predicted that, once Palace's fortunes improved, Harrison would become "one of the most talked about wingers in the game". He was selected to play in the Third Division South representative team in 1957.

In the following season, George Cooper took over at centre forward, scoring 17 goals. Harrison contributed seven goals as Palace improved their league position, finishing 14th. Unfortunately, this was two places below the cut-off point for the re-organisation of the league structure, and Palace played in the newly created Fourth Division in 1958–59. Harrison only managed 14 league games in the 1958–59 season, with Ron Brett or Gerry Priestley being preferred in the No. 7 shirt.

In the summer of 1959, Harrison left Selhurst Park having made exactly 100 first team appearances, 92 in the League and 8 in the FA Cup, scoring 12 goals (all in league matches).

Southampton
Harrison was recruited for Southampton, then in the Third Division, by manager Ted Bates as cover for Terry Paine. Paine's fitness was such, however, that he never missed a match in the one season that Harrison spent at The Dell. Harrison's three appearances for the "Saints" came in October, when Paine switched first to the left to replace the injured John Sydenham, and then to inside right in place of George O'Brien. Harrison's first and last matches were both against Barnsley. The second match was at home to Swindon Town when Derek Reeves scored four, with one from Paine, in a 5–1 victory on 10 October 1959. The Daily Echo reported that "Bernard Harrison (did) well on the right wing".

Despite this, Harrison was unable to displace Paine and spent the rest of the season in the reserves. In his biography, Kevin Smallbone argues that Harrison was "too talented for his own good" and Harrison said (in 2005) that he "was doing too many things, I didn't have time to train". Speaking to Paine's biographer, David Bull, Harrison commented that he "couldn't understand" why Ted Bates didn't switch Terry Paine to inside-left to accommodate him on the right.

At the end of the season, Southampton were able to celebrate taking the Third Division title, whereas Harrison decided to try his luck elsewhere.

Exeter City
At the end of the 1959–60 season, Harrison moved along the coast to join Exeter City where he spent one season, making 18 appearances in the Fourth Division scoring four goals.

Over the next few years, he played for a succession of non-league clubs, ending his career at Winchester City.

Cricket career

Harrison joined Hampshire and spent most of his career playing in the Second XI as an opening batsman, understudying Roy Marshall and Jimmy Gray.

He made his debut for the first XI against Oxford University in June 1957, not making any significant contribution in a drawn match. His County Championship debut came in May 1958, against Worcester, scoring only a single and not being called on to bowl – Hampshire won the match by 9 wickets.

A strong right-hand batsman he achieved his top score of 110 versus Oxford University played at Portsmouth in July 1961. In this match, he shared with Mike Barnard in a stand of 119 for the second wicket. Six of his 14 county matches were against Oxford University, and both his fifties and his only first-class hundred also came against them. He contributed to the team led by Colin Ingleby-Mackenzie that won Hampshire's first County Championship in 1961 and played four times in 1962. He continued to appear infrequently for the Second XI, the last time in 1968.

Later career
Harrison was a qualified teacher, and amongst his positions was that of Sports and Mathematics teacher at Farleigh School, firstly at Basingstoke and from 1982 at Red Rice near Andover. Harrison's club cricket was with Basingstoke & North Hants Cricket Club, where he also coached.

He also excelled at other sports, gaining county recognition in badminton and table tennis and could also have done so in hockey while at school but football took preference.

Biography
In 2001, his biography "Brushes with the Greats – The Story of a Footballer/Cricketer", written by Kevin Smallbone, was published by Sportingmemoriesonline.com.

References

External links
Obituary on Hampshire CC site
Cricinfo profile
Cricketarchive profile

1934 births
2006 deaths
Sportspeople from Worcester, England
People educated at Peter Symonds College
English footballers
Association football forwards
Portsmouth F.C. players
Crystal Palace F.C. players
Southampton F.C. players
Exeter City F.C. players
Poole Town F.C. players
Dorchester Town F.C. players
Andover F.C. players
Portals Athletic F.C. players
Winchester City F.C. players
English Football League players
English cricketers
Hampshire cricketers
People from St John's, Worcester